Kill Squad vs. Doubleheader was a Swedish electronic musical duo that released two CDs in 1997:  Wave Your Hands and At Home EP.  Their record label was Superstudio Grå, a division of Diesel Music.

Kill Squad is Daniel Lindeberg, a DJ and live performer who now calls himself "Dumb Dan."  Doubleheader is Magnus Häglund, a graphic designer who lives in Visby and published a graphic novel, Vill någon väl, in 1998.

External links
 Dumb Dan's MySpace page
 Magnus Häglund's webpage

Swedish electronic music groups